Phil Henderson may refer to:

 Phil Henderson (writer) (born 1968), American novelist, illustrator, essayist, and poet
 Phil Henderson (basketball) (1968–2013), American basketball player